"Thick of It" is a song by American singer Mary J. Blige. It was written by Blige, Darhyl "DJ" Camper Jr., and Jazmine Sullivan for her thirteenth studio album Strength of a Woman (2017), while production was helmed by Camper. The song embodies portions of the song "Give a Little Love" (1975) by Scottish pop rock band Bay City Rollers. Due to the inclusion of the sample, John Goodison and Phil Wainman are also credited as songwriters. The song was released as the lead single from the album on October 7, 2016 . "Thick of It" went to number one on the US Adult R&B Songs chart.

Music video
The music video for "Thick of It" was directed by Dennis Leupold. It was released on November 7, 2016.

Track listing

Credits and personnel 
Credits adapted from the liner notes of Strength of a Woman.

Mary J. Blige – vocals, writer
David D. Brown – backing vocals
Marshall Bryant – recording assistant 
Darhyl Camper Jr. – producer, writer
Maddox Chhim – mixing assistant 
John Goodison – writer
Jaymz Hardy-Martin III – recording

Charles "Prince Charlez" Hinshaw – backing vocals
Jon Nettlesbey – recording assistant 
Jaycen Joshua – mixing
David Nakaji – mixing assistant
Jazmine Sullivan – backing vocals, writer
Phil Wainman – writer

Charts

Weekly charts

Year-end charts

Release history

References

2016 singles
2016 songs
Mary J. Blige songs
Capitol Records singles
Contemporary R&B ballads
2010s ballads
Songs written by Darhyl Camper
Songs written by Mary J. Blige
Songs written by Jazmine Sullivan
Songs written by Phil Wainman
Songs written by John Goodison (musician)